Byramjee is a Hindic given name. Notable people with the name include:

Byramjee Jeejeebhoy (1822–1890), Indian businessman and philanthropist
Keki Byramjee Grant (1920–2011), Indian cardiologist

Indian masculine given names